The 2010–11 Ligue Haïtienne season was the 47th season of top-tier football in Haiti. It began on 30 July 2010 and ended on 30 January 2011. The league is split into two tournaments—the Série de Ouverture and the Série de Clôture—each with identical formats and each contested by the same 16 teams.

Teams
JS Capoise and ASPDIF finished in 15th and 16th place in the overall table at the end of last season and were relegated to the Haitian second level leagues. They were replaced by the two Haitian second level promotion playoff winners: Eclair and América des Cayes.

In addition, Aigle Noir and Racing FC finished in 13th and 14th place in the overall table at the end of last season and took part in promotion-relegation playoffs for their spots in the league against the runners-up of the second level promotion playoffs. These promotion-relegation playoffs were played as two matches, one at each club's stadium. Aigle Noir defeated Inter de Grand-Goave 2–1 on aggregate, while Racing FC defeated FICA 1–1 on aggregate, 1–0 on away goals. Thus, both clubs retained their spots in the league.

Série de Ouverture
The 2010 Série de Ouverture began on 30 July 2010 and ended on 7 October 2010.

Standings

Results

Série de Clôture
The 2010 Série de Clôture began on 29 October 2010 and ended on 30 January 2011.

Standings

Results

Overall standings

Trophée des Champions
This match is contested between the winner of the Série de Ouverture and the winner of the Série de Clôture. This match took place on 5 February 2011.

2010–11 Super Huit
The 2010–11 Super Huit competition (English: Super Eight) is a knockout tournament played at the end of the season among the clubs finishing in the top 8 of the overall standings for the season for cash prizes. The competition normally uses a two-legged format for the quarterfinals and semifinals, but will use a single leg format throughout for this edition. This competition took place between 12 and 20 February 2011.

Quarterfinals
These matches took place on 12 and 13 February 2011.

1Aigle Noir won the match by a drawing of lots.

Semifinals
These matches took place on 16 and 17 February 2011.

2Aigle Noir won the match by a drawing of lots.

Final
This match took place on 20 February 2011.

References

External links
 Soccerway
 RSSSF

2010-11
Haiti
2010 in Haitian sport
2011 in Haitian sport